Lahouari Bahlaz (born 12 March 1979) is an Algerian track and field athlete who competes in disability athletics in the F32 category. Bahlaz specializes in both the discus and club throw, winning two bronze medals at the 2012 Summer Paralympics in London.

Athletics career
Bahlaz began training as an athlete at the age of 30. His first major international competition was at the 2011 IPC Athletics World Championships in Christchurch. There he entered two throwing events the club throw and the discus winning gold in both and setting a new world record of 20.30m in the latter. He followed this by representing Algeria at the 2012 Summer Paralympics in London, again competing in the club throw F31/32/52 and discus F32-24. At London he equaled his world record distance in the discus, but he was beaten into third place with world records by both Wang Yanzhang of China (F34) and Hani Alnakhli of Saudi Arabia (F33). Bahlaz took his second bronze medal of the Games with a throw of 36.31m and missing out on the gold medal by 7 points.

He followed this in 2013 with another successful World Championships, beating both Wang and Alnakhli in the discus to retain his gold medal. He also successfully defended his club throw title to leave Lyon with two gold medals.

References

World record holders in Paralympic athletics
1979 births
Living people
Algerian discus throwers
Algerian club throwers
Medalists at the 2012 Summer Paralympics
Athletes (track and field) at the 2012 Summer Paralympics
Paralympic bronze medalists for Algeria
Algerian male athletes
Male discus throwers
Male club throwers
Algerian people with disabilities
Track and field athletes with limb difference
People from Oran
World Para Athletics Championships winners
Paralympic medalists in athletics (track and field)
Athletes (track and field) at the 2020 Summer Paralympics
21st-century Algerian people
20th-century Algerian people